The ornate day gecko (Cnemaspis ornata) is a species of gecko found in southern India (Tirunelveli and Anaimalai Hills, Malabar, Travancore).

References

 Beddome, R.H. 1870 Descriptions of some new lizards from the Madras Presidency. Madras Monthly J. Med. Sci. 1: 30-35

Cnemaspis
Reptiles described in 1870